The Wishing Well is a fantasy romantic drama movie made for the Hallmark Channel, which premiered in the UK in 2009 and had its USA premiere in 2010. It was directed by David Jackson and starred Jordan Ladd and Jason London.

Plot Summary
Cynthia (Ladd), a shallow journalist,  is sent to a small town to investigate its reportedly magic wishing well. She makes a wish and enters a parallel universe in which she is working for the town's local newspaper run by local, Mark (London).

References

External links
 CrownMediaThe Wishing Well on IMDb

American romantic fantasy films
Hallmark Channel original films
2009 television films
2009 films
2000s American films